The YX600 Radian is a sport/touring motorcycle manufactured by the Yamaha Motor Company between the years of 1986–1990. Except for the suspension, the rest of the Radian was a parts-bin motorcycle and came equipped with a slightly detuned for mid and low-end torque version of air-cooled, inline-4 which came from the Yamaha XJ600 that was also along with the Radian used in the Yamaha FZ-600 Sport Motorcycle (precursor of Yamaha's FZR series of performance bikes), as well as smaller carburetors and frame from the 550 Maxim. Cycle World obtained for the Radian a 1/4 mi. time of 12.76 @  and  acceleration at 3.8 seconds.

Specifications

References

External links

YX600 Radian
Standard motorcycles
Motorcycles introduced in 1986